Into the Storm is a 2014 American found footage disaster film directed by Steven Quale, written by John Swetnam, starring Richard Armitage, Sarah Wayne Callies, Matt Walsh, Alycia Debnam-Carey, and Arlen Escarpeta. It is a meteorological disaster film about a rash of tornadoes striking the fictional town of Silverton, Oklahoma. The film was released by Warner Bros. Pictures on August 8, 2014 to mixed reviews from critics, with some comparing the film to Twister.

Plot
In the town of Silverton, Oklahoma, the local high school senior class is preparing for graduation. The high school's vice-principal, Gary Fuller, has asked his two sons, Trey and Donnie, to record messages from the seniors for a time capsule to be opened in 25 years. Elsewhere, Pete, a veteran storm chaser, has been attempting to intercept and film tornadoes using a  Tornado Intercept Vehicle nicknamed Titus, but has come up short all year long. Upon learning of a major line of developing storms, the chasers decide to head for Silverton in hopes of filming tornadoes. After arriving in Silverton, the team discovers that the cell they had been chasing has dissipated, but  the Silverton cell abruptly strengthens, resulting in a hailstorm and tornado. As the team films, the funnel shifts course and heads for the high school.

At the high school, the weather suddenly sours. The students are marshaled into the school building. In the aftermath of the tornado, shaken students emerge from the damaged building to view the destruction, while Gary sets out to rescue his eldest son Donnie, who had gone to an abandoned paper mill to help his friend Kaitlyn with a project; both were subsequently trapped when the tornado brought the building down on them.

As Pete's storm chase team stops in a small part of town, a tornado takes shape just as Gary and Trey arrive, destroying several buildings. Before the tornado dissipates Gary must save Pete's meteorologist, Allison Stone. Then, Pete's team agree to help Gary get to the paper mill. While en route, another round of tornadoes form and encircle Pete's team, in the process destroying a residential neighborhood and a car lot. An explosion turns one of the tornadoes into a firenado, which Jacob the cameraman tries to film, only to be caught up in the storm and killed. This causes friction in the team, as Pete's concern seems to be more on collecting data than ensuring his team's safety. After recovering their vehicles, Allison leaves with Gary to continue their trip to the paper mill.

At the mill, a water pipe abruptly breaks and begins to flood the hole in which the two students are trapped. Injured and at risk of drowning, the two record messages for their loved ones, then prepare for the worst. At the last minute, Gary and Allison arrive and successfully free them.

In the skies above Silverton, a convergence of two large tornadoes results in a colossal EF-5 tornado that threatens to level the town. The town's citizens have taken shelter at the school, but Pete's team determines that the school's storm shelter will be inadequate. Unable to alert the school's staff with mobile devices, Pete's team rushes to the school. While citizens rush to board school buses, Pete and his team follow the storm, but the last school bus and a handful of cars are cut off from the retreat due to a downed transmission tower.

The storm chasers and school refugees take cover in a storm drain at a construction site, but a Truck from the airport that the tornado struck damages one of the storm grates, compromising the shelter. In an attempt to save lives, Pete hands over his research hard drives to Gary, then sacrifices himself by leaving the shelter to move Titus down to the storm grate, to use the vehicle to anchor the storm grate to the concrete face. Titus's equipment proves unable to anchor the vehicle to the ground, and the tornado picks up the vehicle. From the camera turret aboard Titus, Pete observes the funnel of the tornado as the vehicle is lifted above the clouds, fulfilling his dream, before then crashing to the ground, killing him and wrecking Titus. Shortly thereafter, the EF-5 tornado dissipates.

In the aftermath of the tornado outbreak, the townspeople begin to clean up and rebuild. As Gary's sons complete their time capsule film, many of those they interview express newfound appreciations for their lives. Allison praises Pete's sacrifice and dedication to science.

The last footage shows two local daredevils Donk and Reevis, who were sucked up by the tornado, have survived the storm.

Cast

 Richard Armitage as Gary Fuller, the vice principal of Silverton High School
 Sarah Wayne Callies as Allison Stone, the somewhat passionate meteorologist on Pete's team. Her desire to be with her daughter often angers Pete.
 Matt Walsh as Peter "Pete" Moore, the veteran storm chaser and the leader of his team. His attitude changes slightly throughout the film.
 Max Deacon as Donnie Fuller, a junior at Silverton High School, and son of Gary Fuller
 Alycia Debnam-Carey as Kaitlyn Johnston, a junior at Silverton High School and Donnie’s love interest
 Nathan Kress as Trey Fuller, a sophomore at Silverton High School, son of Gary Fuller & brother of Donnie
 Arlen Escarpeta as Daryl Karley, a camera operator
 Jeremy Sumpter as Jacob Hodges, a camera operator
 Lee Whittaker as Lucas Guerrette
 Stephanie Koenig as Marcia
 Kyle Davis as Donk
 Jon Reep as Reevis
 Scott Lawrence as Principal Thomas Walker
 David Drumm as Chester
 Brandon Ruiter as Todd
 Kron Moore as Mrs. Blasky
 Patrick Sarniak as High School Teacher (uncredited)

Production

On October 28, 2011, Deadline reported that New Line Cinema bought the "found footage" natural disaster spec script written by John Swetnam, and that Todd Garner would be producing the film through his Broken Road Productions company. Garner came up with the idea for the script. On January 5, 2012 it was announced that director Steve Quale would direct the then-untitled "Found-Footage" Tornado thriller.

On April 24, 2012, Variety reported that New Line had given the green light for their next film project, about an EF6 tornado (although the current EF5 category has no upper limit), and that the film was in development and set to begin shooting on July 9 in Detroit. On August 23, 2012, the untitled "Category Six" Tornado project film got the title Black Sky, and was filming in Detroit. On September 24, 2013, New Line retitled the film to Into the Storm and set the release date to August 8, 2014.

Casting
An open casting call was held on May 19, 2012 in Pontiac, Michigan. On May 24, Alycia Debnam-Carey signed up to play a female lead. On June 1, New Line added Arlen Escarpeta to the project. On June 22, Sarah Wayne Callies signed up to play Allison Stone. On July 2, New Line cast Nathan Kress, who portrayed a brother finding his sibling. On July 11, 2012, Richard Armitage signed up to portray Gary Fuller, a widowed father who tries to rescue his son from the tornadoes. Shooting was set to begin on July 23 in Detroit. On July 13, Max Deacon joined the film's cast to play Donnie, an introverted teen with a crush on his high school's prettiest girl. Comedian Matt Walsh joined the cast of the film on August 1, 2012 to play the character of Pete.

Filming
Principal photography began in July 2012 in Detroit. On August 13, 2012, shooting moved to Rochester, Michigan, two weeks after filming wrapped in Detroit. It was also filmed in Oakland Charter Township, Oakview Middle School and Oakland University.

Music
The film's music was scored by Brian Tyler. The soundtrack of the film was released on August 5, 2014.

Visual effects
The visual effects are provided by Digital Domain, Moving Picture Company, Cinesite, Method Studios, Prime Focus World, Scanline VFX and The Third Floor, Inc. and Supervised by Jay Barton, Guillaume Rocheron, Simon Stanley-Clamp, Nordin Rahhali, Bruce Woloshyn, Randy Goux, Chad Wiebe, Shawn Hull and Tracy L. Kettler with help from Hydraulx and Rhythm and Hues Studios.

Release
On September 24, 2013, Warner Bros. set the film to be released on August 8, 2014. The film was released on Digital HD on October 28, 2014, and on DVD and Blu-ray on November 18, 2014.

Box office
Into the Storm grossed $46.4 million in the US and $100.4 million in other territories for a total of $146.8 million, against a production budget of $50 million.

Critical response
On review aggregator website Rotten Tomatoes the film has an approval rating of 21% based on 156 reviews and an average rating of 4.28/10. The website's critical consensus reads, "Clumsily scripted and populated with forgettable characters, Into the Storm has little to offer beyond its admittedly thrilling special effects." On Metacritic, the film has a weighted average score of 44 out of 100, based on 32 critics, indicating "mixed or average reviews".

Varietys Scott Foundas called the film a feature-length VFX demo reel that makes one pine for the glory days of Jan de Bont.
Scott Mendelson of Forbes reviewed the film and commented that the film is visually dazzling and mostly successful in updating the disaster film for the YouTube age. He said, "The special effects work is basically flawless, and you absolutely get what you arguably came to see. You want big-screen images of insanely large-scale tornadoes and big-scale devastation and disaster carnage? Into the Storm gives you plenty of rock-solid disaster porn."

References

External links

 Official Website
 
 
 
 

2014 films
2010s disaster films
2010s survival films
American disaster films
American survival films
Dune Entertainment films
Films about tornadoes
Films set in Oklahoma
Films shot in Michigan
Films directed by Steven Quale
Films scored by Brian Tyler
Found footage films
New Line Cinema films
Village Roadshow Pictures films
Warner Bros. films
Films shot in Detroit
2010s English-language films
2010s American films
sv:Into the Storm (2014 film)